The 2014 Piala Sumbangsih was the 29th edition of the Piala Sumbangsih, an annual football match played between the winners of the previous season's Malaysia Super League and Malaysia Cup. The game was played between Pahang, who beat Kelantan to win the 2013 Malaysia Cup Final, and LionsXII, champions of the 2013 Malaysia Super League. Watched by a crowd of 40,000 at Darul Makmur Stadium, Pahang won the match 1–0.

Match Details

Winners

References

Piala Sumbangsih seasons
2014 in Malaysian football